Dhurve may refer to:
Jyoti Dhurve, Indian politician
Om Prakash Dhurve, Indian politician